Adie Allen (born in 1966) is a British actress who graduated from the Royal Academy of Dramatic Art, RADA in 1987. She has appeared in new plays at the Royal Court, the Almeida, the Bush and the Tricycle Theatre(s). She frequently appears on British television. Notable television appearances include Casualty (she played student nurse Kelly Liddle in a number of episodes in 1991, the television series 99-1 playing Liz Hulley in 1994, Alan Ayckbourn's West End premiere of Communicating Doors at the Gielgud Theatre in 1996, playing the time-travelling prostitute Poopay, as well as the 1997 television drama The Woman in White playing Margaret Porcher, and the Peter Kosminsky film Innocents, playing Helen Rickard in 2000. She was brought up in Bristol and was educated at Monks Park Comprehensive School, leaving when she was sixteen.

She is married to the architect Duncan Dalgleish, and has three children.

Filmography

Film

Television

External links

English television actresses
Living people
1966 births
Alumni of RADA